The Call of the Toad, published in Germany in 1992 as Unkenrufe, is a novel by Danzig-born German author Günter Grass. It describes the love story between the German widower Alexander Reschke and Alexandra Polin widowed Piatkowska. It was adapted into a 2005 film directed by Robert Gliński.

References
 

1992 German novels
Novels by Günter Grass